Oreophrynella nigra, or pebble toad, is a species of toad in the family Bufonidae. It is endemic to the Guiana Highlands in Bolívar State, Venezuela, and known from two tepuis, Kukenan-tepui and Yuruani-tepui, both belonging to the Eastern Tepuis.

Description and behaviour
It is a small species of toad: males measure  and females  in snout–vent length.

When threatened, the toad folds its limbs under its body, tucks its head in and tenses in a ball shape. If on an incline (this is how it gets its name), this causes it to roll down the slope, escaping the attention of its predator, and looking like a dislodged pebble. Its cryptic black and dark grey coloring that may appear as dark navy blue to some blends with its sandstone habitat.

Habitat and conservation
Its natural habitats are rocks and peat bogs in montane tepui environments at elevations of  asl. It is classified as vulnerable because of its apparently restricted range.

Media interest
This toad was featured on a BBC series, Life, pursued by a tarantula spider.

References

External links

nigra
Rolling animals
Amphibians of Venezuela
Endemic fauna of Venezuela
Taxa named by Josefa Celsa Señaris
Taxa named by José Ayarzagüena
Amphibians described in 1994
Taxonomy articles created by Polbot
Amphibians of the Tepuis